Wittekind Adolf Heinrich Georg-Wilhelm, Prince of Waldeck and Pyrmont (born 9 March 1936) has since 1967 been the head of the House of Waldeck and Pyrmont.

Early life
He was born in Arolsen the son of Hereditary Prince Josias of Waldeck and Pyrmont and his wife, Duchess Altburg of Oldenburg (1903–2001). Adolf Hitler and Heinrich Himmler were his godfathers. Wittekind, who has served in the German Armed Forces and held the rank lieutenant colonel, succeeded as head of the House of Waldeck and Pyrmont on the death of his father on 30 November 1967. He lives with his family at Arolsen Castle.

Marriage and issue
Wittekind was married on 19 May 1988 in Frohnleiten to Countess Cecilie von Goëss-Saurau (b. 1956). They have three sons.

Honours
9 August 2001: Federal Cross of Merit from Roland Koch, then Minister-President of Hesse.

Ancestors

Notes

1936 births
Living people
People from Bad Arolsen
Princes of Waldeck and Pyrmont
House of Waldeck and Pyrmont
Recipients of the Cross of the Order of Merit of the Federal Republic of Germany
German Army personnel
Military personnel from Hesse